Erin Chambers (born September 24, 1979) is an American actress, best known for her role as Siobhan McKenna Spencer on ABC soap opera General Hospital.  She has made guest appearances in a number of television shows.

Personal life
Chambers was born in Portland, Oregon, and received a BFA in acting from Brigham Young University.
Chambers is a Latter-day Saint.

Chambers married Carson McKay in December 2002. The couple have a son, Roan, born June 2, 2016,  and a daughter Lilian Mae born in 2018.

Career
In film, Chambers played the female lead in The Singles 2nd Ward.  She starred in the Disney Channel original movie Don't Look Under the Bed. She also starred in the 2007 film Heber Holiday along with Torrey DeVitto. Chambers starred as Priscilla Presley in the 2007 film Tears of a King alongside Matt Lewis as Elvis Presley, which depicts Elvis's last years. Chambers starred in the 2008 LDS film The Errand of Angels, the story of an LDS missionary in Austria learning to cope with a different culture and the missionary lifestyle, as well as a difficult companion. Chambers also has had many guest roles in television shows such as Drake & Josh, ER, Veronica Mars, Joan of Arcadia, Stargate: Atlantis, CSI: Crime Scene Investigation, CSI: NY, Bones, Standoff, and Cold Case.

From 2010 to 2011 she was a regular cast member of the ABC daytime soap opera General Hospital, playing the Irish character Siobhan McKenna. In April 2013, it was announced that Chambers had joined The Young and the Restless as Melanie Daniels in a recurring role. Her first airdate was on June 6. Her character was written out in August, 2013. In fall 2013, Chambers appeared in ABC primetime drama Scandal.

Filmography

Video games

References

External links

1979 births
20th-century American actresses
21st-century American actresses
Actresses from Portland, Oregon
American film actresses
Latter Day Saints from Oregon
American television actresses
Brigham Young University alumni
Living people
American soap opera actresses
Lakeridge High School alumni